Cove is an unincorporated community in South Harbor Township, Mille Lacs County, Minnesota, United States, near Onamia.  The community is located along State Highway 27 (MN 27) near 100th Avenue.

References

Unincorporated communities in Mille Lacs County, Minnesota
Unincorporated communities in Minnesota